Claude Joseph Dorat (31 December 1734 – 29 April 1780) was a French writer, also known as Le Chevalier Dorat.

He was born in Paris, of a family consisting of generations of lawyers, and he joined the corps of the king's musketeers. He became fashionable for his work, Réponse d'Abélard à Héloise ("Abelard's Answer to Heloise"), and followed up this first success with a number of heroic epistles, Les Victimes de l'amour, ou lettres de quelques amants célébres (1776) ("Victims of Love, or Letters from some famous lovers").

Besides light verse he wrote comedies, fables and, among other novels, Les Sacrifices de lamour, ou lettres de la vicomtesse de Senanges et du chevalier de Versenay (1771). He tried to cover his failures as a dramatist by buying up large numbers of seats for performances, and his books were lavishly illustrated by good artists and expensively produced, in order to secure their success.  Nevertheless, he managed to attract hatred both of the philosophe party as well as of their arch-enemy, Charles Palissot de Montenoy, and thus cut himself off from the possibility of academic honours. Le Tartufe littéraire (1774) attacked La Harpe and Palissot, and at the same time D'Alembert and Mlle de Lespinasse.

Works

References

External links 
 
 His plays on CÉSAR
 Books and documents by Claude Joseph Dorat at Gallica
 Claude-Joseph Dorat on Data.bnf.fr

1734 births
1780 deaths
18th-century French journalists
18th-century French writers
18th-century French male writers
18th-century French dramatists and playwrights